Two Friends may refer to:

Film
 Two Friends (1954 film), a Soviet film
 The Two Friends, a 1955 Italian film
 Two Friends (1986 film), an Australian film by Jane Campion
 Two Friends (2002 film), an Italian film
 Two Friends (2015 film), a French film

Other uses
 Two Friends (DJs), an American DJ/producer duo
 Two Friends (ship), a Napoleonic War-era British troop transport
 "Two Friends" (short story), an 1882 story by Guy de Maupassant
 Two Friends, a 2017 EP by Donna De Lory